Blue Mountain Community College is a community college located in Pendleton, Oregon, United States, and serves Umatilla and Morrow counties as well as most of Baker County. It was established in 1962 and currently offers Associate of Arts degrees, Associate of Science degrees, Associate of Applied Science degrees, Certificates, and transfer degrees to four-year colleges.

Locations

Blue Mountain Community College's main branch is located in Pendleton, Oregon. Other branches are located in Milton-Freewater, Hermiston, Baker City, John Day, Ione, and Boardman.

Blue Mountain also offers a variety of distance education programs for those students residing in outlying areas.

Eastern Oregon University also has a Distance Education Office located at the Pendleton branch of BMCC.

Athletics
Blue Mountain Community College has athletics for both men and women organized under the office of Student & Enrollment Services. BMCC is a member of the Northwest Athletic Association of Community Colleges and the National Intercollegiate Rodeo Association. BMCC offers basketball, volleyball, baseball, softball, and rodeo.

The Northwest Athletic Association of Community Colleges comprises 36 colleges divided into four Regions. Blue Mountain CC is in the Eastern Region along with Big Bend CC, Columbia Basin College, CC of Spokane, Walla Walla CC, Wenatchee Valley College, Yakima Valley CC and Treasure Valley CC.

Blue Mountain's athletic complex was completed in 1975.

See also 
 List of Oregon community colleges

References

External links
Blue Mountain Community College

Education in Morrow County, Oregon
Pendleton, Oregon
Education in Baker County, Oregon
Community colleges in Oregon
Educational institutions established in 1962
Universities and colleges accredited by the Northwest Commission on Colleges and Universities
Education in Umatilla County, Oregon
Two-year colleges in the United States
1962 establishments in Oregon